Hager is the surname of several people:

Åke Häger (1897–1968), Swedish gymnast
Albert David Hager (1817–1888), American geologist
Alva L. Hager (1850–1923), American politician 
Axel Hager (born 1969), German beach volleyball player
Britt Hager (born 1966), American football player
Cassie Hager (born 1984), American basketball player
Chris Hager, guitarist with heavy metal band Rough Cutt
David Hager, American physician
Friderich Christian Hager (1756–1795), Danish colonial commander and governor
Hager Twins, Jim (1941–2008) and Jon (1941–2009), American country music singers
Henry G. Hager (born 1934), American politician
Isaac Hager (born 1970s), American real estate developer
Jake Hager (born 1982), German-American wrestler and MMA fighter also known as Jack Swagger
Jenna Bush Hager (born 1981), daughter of President George W. Bush
John Hager (cartoonist) (1858–1932), American cartoonist
John F. Hager (1873–1955), American politician
John H. Hager (1936–2020), American politician
John Sharpenstein Hager (1818–1890), American politician
Kristen Hager (born 1984), Canadian actress
Leopold Hager (born 1935), Austrian conductor 
Liz Hager, American politician
Mandy Hager, New Zealand writer
Mark Hager (born 1964), Australian field hockey player
Nicky Hager (born 1958), New Zealand author and investigative journalist
Paul Hager (1925–1983), German theatre and opera director
Peter Hager II (1784–1854), New York politician
Robert Hager, American news analyst 
Rocky Hager, American football player
Mordechai Hager, (1922-2018) Grand Rabbi of Vizhnitz-Monsey
Shraga Feivish Hager, rebbe of the Kosov Hasidic dynasty
Steven Hager (born 1951), counterculture and marijuana activist
Tobias Hager (born 1973), German football player

See also
Hagar (disambiguation)
Hager, West Virginia
Hager Group
Haggar (disambiguation)
Hagger